Between May 2014 and May 2019, the KwaZulu-Natal Legislature, the official legislature of the KwaZulu-Natal province of South Africa, consisted of 80 members from six different political parties, elected on 7 May 2014 in the 2014 South African general election. The African National Congress (ANC) retained its majority in the legislature with a total of 52 seats, an increase of one seat from the previous legislature elected in 2009.

By contrast, the Inkatha Freedom Party (IFP) lost nine seats and was replaced by the Democratic Alliance (DA) as the official opposition in the legislature. With nine seats, compared to the DA's ten, the IFP was the third-largest party in the legislature. The fourth- and fifth-largest were both newly established parties: the National Freedom Party (NFP) occupied six seats and the Economic Freedom Fighters (EFF) occupied two. A seat apiece had been lost by the Minority Front (MF), the African Christian Democratic Party (ACDP), and the Congress of the People (Cope), leaving the MF with only one seat and the ACDP and Cope without any representation at all. 

Members of the 5th Provincial Legislature took office on 21 May 2014 and served until the general election of 8 May 2019. During the first sitting of the legislature, the ANC's Senzo Mchunu was elected to his first full term as Premier of KwaZulu-Natal. Also from the ANC, Lydia Johnson was retained as Speaker and Meshack Radebe became Deputy Speaker. Sizwe Mchunu of the DA took office as Leader of the Opposition. On 25 May 2016, Willies Mchunu took over as Premier.

Composition 
This comparison of party strengths from the 5th KwaZulu-Natal Legislature is represented graphically.

 Note this is not the official seating plan of the KwaZulu-Natal Legislature.

|-style="background:#e9e9e9;"
!colspan="2" style="text-align:left"| Party !! style="text-align:center"| Seats 
|-
|  || 52
|-
|  || 10 
|-
|  || 9 
|-
|  || 6
|-
|  || 2
|-
|  || 1 
|-
|colspan="2" style="text-align:left"| Total || style="text-align:right"| 80
|}

Members 
This table depicts the list of members of the 5th KwaZulu-Natal Legislature as elected in the election of 7 May 2014. Members of the Provincial Legislature (MPLs) are elected through a system of party-list proportional representation with closed lists.

References 

Legislature